Bananal River may refer to the following rivers in Brazil:

 Bananal River (Paraíba do Sul)
 Bananal River (Tocantins)

See also
 Banana River, in Florida, U.S.